Žan Cankar (born 13 November 1990) is a footballer from Slovenia. He plays for SG Drautal.

References

External links
NZS profile 

1990 births
Living people
Footballers from Ljubljana
Slovenian footballers
Association football fullbacks
NK IB 1975 Ljubljana players
NK Krka players
NK Ivančna Gorica players
Slovenian PrvaLiga players
Slovenian expatriate footballers
Slovenian expatriate sportspeople in Austria
Expatriate footballers in Austria